The Swedish Society for Interlingua (Societate Svedese pro Interlingua, SSI), founded January 1, 1964, is an agency that operates in Sweden to publicize Interlingua and encourage its active use. The SSI arranges activities, produces Interlingua publications, and collaborates with the other Nordic Interlingua organizations to publish Actualitates - Interlingua i Norden, a magazine in Interlingua and the Scandinavian languages. 

The SSI is probably the only Interlingua organization to have had an entire professional division as members. During the Presidency of Bertil Palmquist, all stenographers of Riksdag, the Swedish Parliament, were members.

References

 Panorama in Interlingua, 2001, Issue 1.

External links

 Portrait del organisationes de Interlingua, Historia de Interlingua, 2001, revised 2006.

Interlingua organizations